Huk! is a 1956 American action film directed by John Barnwell and written by Stirling Silliphant and filmed in the Philippines. The film stars George Montgomery, Mona Freeman, John Baer, James Bell, Teddy Benavides and Mario Barri. The film was released on August 9, 1956, by United Artists.  It is the first Philippine film of George Montgomery who would return to the islands in the 1960s to produce, direct, co-write and star in a number of Philippine films.

Plot
Greg Dickson is an American born and raised in the Philippines. He returns to sell his deceased father's plantation after World War II and Philippine independence. His plantation ends up in the middle of the Huk Rebellion, with Greg and plantation workers fighting the rebel guerillas.

Cast
 George Montgomery as Greg Dickson
 Mona Freeman as Cindy Rogers
 John Baer as Bart Rogers
 James Bell as Stephen Rogers
 Teddy Benavides as Major Balatbat 
 Mario Barri as Kalak
 Ben Perez as Pinote

References

External links 
 

1956 films
1950s action films
American action films
Films set in the Philippines
Films shot in the Philippines
Films about rebellions in the Philippines
Films with screenplays by Stirling Silliphant
Films scored by Albert Glasser
United Artists films
1950s English-language films
1950s American films